"I'll Take Good Care of You", written by Bert Berns (aka Bert Russell) and Jerry Ragovoy, is a song recorded by Garnet Mimms for United Artists in 1966. Though more obscure than the Berns/Ragovoy/Mimms song "Cry Baby", "I'll Take Good Care Of You" is another in their joint body of work.

Song information 
The song was released in early 1966. It is in the key of G major with a tempo of 48 beats per minute. It peaked at number 30 on the Billboard Hot 100 in May 1966 and charted for 9 weeks.

Covers 
A cover version of the song was released in 1967 by Cliff Bennett and the Rebel Rousers.

References

1966 singles
Songs written by Bert Berns
Songs written by Jerry Ragovoy
1966 songs
Song recordings produced by Bert Berns
United Artists Records singles